Vallonia excentrica, common name the eccentric vallonia, is a species of very small air-breathing land snail, a terrestrial pulmonate gastropod mollusk in the family Valloniidae.

Distribution
This species has a Holarctic distribution and has been introduced elsewhere. Its occurrence includes:

Africa
 Saint Helena

Europe
 Great Britain
 Ireland
 Czech Republic
 Ukraine

Australia
 Introduced to south-eastern Australia as well as Lord Howe Island and Norfolk Island.

North America
 British Columbia<ref>Robert G. Forsyth. Terrestrial Gastropods of the Columbia Basin, British Columbia Family Valloniidae. Accessed 25 April 2009.</ref> in Canada

References

 Spencer, H.G., Marshall, B.A. & Willan, R.C. (2009). Checklist of New Zealand living Mollusca.'' pp 196–219 in Gordon, D.P. (ed.) New Zealand inventory of biodiversity. Volume one. Kingdom Animalia: Radiata, Lophotrochozoa, Deuterostomia. Canterbury University Press, Christchurch.
 Barker, G. M. (1999). Naturalised terrestrial Stylommatophora (Mollusca: Gastropoda). Fauna of New Zealand 38: 1-254.
 Kerney, M.P., Cameron, R.A.D. & Jungbluth, J-H. (1983). Die Landschnecken Nord- und Mitteleuropas. Ein Bestimmungsbuch für Biologen und Naturfreunde, 384 pp., 24 plates. 
 Sysoev, A. V. & Schileyko, A. A. (2009). Land snails and slugs of Russia and adjacent countries. Sofia/Moskva (Pensoft). 312 pp., 142 plates.
 Minato, H. (1988). A systematic and bibliographic list of the Japanese land snails. H. Minato, Shirahama, 294 pp., 7 pls.

External links
 Pilsbry, H. A. (1892-1893). Manual of conchology, structural and systematic, with illustrations of the species. Ser. 2, Pulmonata. Vol. 8: Helicidae, vol. 6. pp 1-314, pls 1-58. Philadelphia, published by the Conchological Section, Academy of Natural Sciences.
 Sterki, V. (1905). November snails. The Nautilus. 19(8): 96

Valloniidae
Gastropods described in 1893
Gastropods of Africa
Gastropods of Australia
Gastropods of Lord Howe Island